Rolland E. Kidder is an American politician and author from New York State.

Born in Jamestown, New York, Kidder served in the United States Navy during the Vietnam War. Kidder graduated from Houghton College and SUNY Buffalo Law School. He later served on the American Battle Monuments Commission and the National World War II Memorial Design Committee.

A Democrat, Kidder served four terms in the New York State Assembly, serving in the 181st, 182nd, 183rd, and 184th New York State Legislatures from January 8, 1975 to December 31, 1982.

References

Members of the New York State Assembly
Politicians from Jamestown, New York
Living people
21st-century American politicians
University at Buffalo Law School alumni
1940 births